Crossover junction endonuclease MUS81 is an enzyme that in humans is encoded by the MUS81 gene.

In mammalian somatic cells, MUS81 and another structure specific DNA endonuclease,  XPF (ERCC4), play overlapping and essential roles in completion of homologous recombination.  The significant overlap in function between these enzymes is most likely related to processing joint molecules such as D-loops and nicked Holliday junctions.

Meiosis
MUS81 is a component of a minor chromosomal crossover (CO) pathway in the meiosis of budding yeast, plants and vertebrates.  However, in the protozoan Tetrahymena thermophila, MUS81 appears to be part of an essential (if not the predominant) CO pathway.  The MUS81 pathway also appears to be the predominant CO pathway in the fission yeast Schizosaccharomyces pombe.

The relationship of the CO pathway to the overall process of meiotic recombination is illustrated in the accompanying diagram.  Recombination during meiosis is often initiated by a DNA double-strand break (DSB). During recombination, sections of DNA at the 5' ends of the break are cut away in a process called resection. In the strand invasion step that follows, an overhanging 3' end of the broken DNA molecule "invades" the DNA of an homologous chromosome that is not broken forming a displacement loop (D-loop). After strand invasion, the further sequence of events may follow either of two main pathways, leading to a crossover (CO) or a non-crossover (NCO) recombinant (see Genetic recombination).  The pathway leading to a CO involves a double Holliday junction (DHJ) intermediate. Holliday junctions need to be resolved for CO recombination to be completed.

MUS81-MMS4, in the budding yeast Saccharomyces cerevisiae, is a DNA structure-selective endonuclease that cleaves joint DNA molecules formed during homologous recombination in meiosis and mitosis.  The MUS81-MMS4 endonuclease, although a minor resolvase for CO formation in S. cerevisiae, is crucial for limiting chromosome entanglements by suppressing multiple consecutive recombination events from initiating from the same DSB.

Mus81 deficient mice have significant meiotic defects including the failure to repair a subset of DSBs.

Interactions 

MUS81 has been shown to interact with CHEK2.

References

Further reading